The 1995 FIRA Women's European Championship was the first official FIRA championship. Four countries entered, and the competition was a straight knockout tournament.

Bracket

Semi-finals

Third place

Final

See also
Women's international rugby

References

External links
FIRA website

1995
1995 rugby union tournaments for national teams
International women's rugby union competitions hosted by Italy
1994–95 in European women's rugby union
1994–95 in French rugby union
1994–95 in Italian rugby union
1995 in Dutch sport
1995 in Spanish women's sport
1995 in French women's sport